Palindromes is a 2004 American comedy-drama film written and directed by Todd Solondz. Referencing Solondz's previous Welcome to the Dollhouse, it was nominated for the Golden Lion award at the 61st Venice International Film Festival.

The protagonist, a 13-year-old girl named Aviva, is played by eight different actors of different ages, races, and genders during the course of the film, which features an array of secondary characters. The names of the characters Aviva, Bob, and Otto are all palindromes.

Plot
The film opens with a funeral for Dawn Wiener (the protagonist from Solondz's Welcome to the Dollhouse), who went to college, gained a lot of weight and acne, and committed suicide at age 20 after she became pregnant from date rape. Her older brother Mark (Matthew Faber, reprising his role) reads the eulogy while Dawn's tearful parents (Angela Pietropinto and Bill Buell, also reprising their roles) sit in the audience and seem to finally show remorse over the way they mistreated her as a child. Dawn's younger sister whom she was estranged from, Missy, does not attend the funeral. One of the attendees is Aviva, Dawn's cousin.

A few years later, Aviva desires to have a child. She has sex with Judah (Robert Agri), a family friend, and becomes pregnant. Aviva's parents are horrified and demand that she get an abortion. While the abortion is technically successful, it is implied via a fractured, emotional conversation with the doctor (Stephen Singer) that Aviva can no longer have children. Not fully conscious, Aviva is unaware of this, and her parents, already fragile, lead her to believe all is well when she awakens, afraid to upset Aviva.

Aviva runs away from home. She befriends a trucker (Stephen Adly Guirgis) and has sex with him; however, the trucker abandons her at a motel. She is eventually found by the Sunshine Family, a Christian fundamentalist foster home that cares for disordered orphans and runaways. She tells them her name is Henrietta — the name she picked for the baby she was persuaded to abort. While at the Sunshine Family home, she discovers a dark side to the foster father; he assassinates abortion providers. His next target is the doctor who performed Aviva's abortion. The hitman whom the foster father uses is the same trucker Aviva previously befriended and had sex with.

Convinced she is in love with the truck driver, Aviva flees the Sunshine Family to join him on his assignment. They have anal sex. The murder does not go as planned as, in addition to the doctor himself, the trucker (whose name is revealed to be Bob) ends up accidentally shooting the doctor's young daughter when she steps in front of the first shot. The police find Bob and Aviva both in a motel room, and a guilt-ridden Bob commits suicide by cop.

The film then skips ahead several months later to Aviva back home with her parents, planning her next birthday party. During the party, she talks to her cousin, Mark, who has recently been arrested and accused of molesting his sister Missy's baby (although he denies having done it and it is loosely implied that Missy might have made it up for attention). Mark tells Aviva that there is no such thing as free will; people are what they were genetically “programmed” to be, and can never truly change. The film skips ahead to Aviva's meeting Judah, who now calls himself Otto, and they have sex again. Afterward, Aviva happily exclaims that she has a feeling that, this time, she is going to be a mother.

Casting
Palindromes is most notable for having eight different actors of different ages, races, and genders play a 13-year-old girl named Aviva. Although Solondz's film premiered in official competition at the Venice Film Festival in 2004, it received little other laudatory notice and remains his most polarizing with critics. With regard to Solondz's employment of multiple performers to play a single character, film critic Roger Ebert wrote in his positive review, "If the movie is a moral labyrinth, it is paradoxically straightforward and powerful in the moment; each individual story has an authenticity and impact of its own. Consider the pathos brought to Aviva by the actress Sharon Wilkins, who is a plus-size adult black woman playing a little girl, and who creates perhaps the most convincing little girl of them all. Or Jennifer Jason Leigh, three times as old as Aviva but barely seeming her age. These individual segments are so effective that at the end of each one we know how we feel, and why. It's just that the next segment invalidates our conclusions." Contrarily, New York Times film critic A. O. Scott concluded in his negative review, "[...] Aviva's appearance changes -- from black to white, from fat to thin, from brunette to redhead, and at one point, to Jennifer Jason Leigh. The effect of this switching is to keep you off balance and at a remove from the story. That is not such a bad thing, because you will want to be as far away as possible."

Cast

Actors playing Aviva

Reception
Palindromes holds a 43% rotten rating on Rotten Tomatoes based on 120 reviews with an average rating of 5.31/10. The site's critical consensus states: "Unique but cold". The film grossed $553,368 in the domestic box office and $707,269 worldwide after almost 23 weeks in theatrical release. The DVD was released on September 13, 2005.

Soundtrack
 "Lullaby (Aviva's and Henrietta's Theme)" — written by Nathan Larson; performed by Nina Persson and Nathan Larson
 "Up on a Cloud" — written by Larson; performed by Persson and Larson 
 "Piano Concerto No. 1 in B-flat minor, Op. 23" — written by Pyotr Ilyich Tchaikovsky
 "Nobody Jesus But You" — written by Eytan Mirsky, Curtis Moore, and Matthew Brookshire; performed by Ricky Ashley, Curtis Moore, Karen Rodriguez, and The Sunshine Singers 
 "Fight for the Children" — written by Mirsky, Moore, and Brookshire; performed by Ashley, Moore, Rodriguez, and The Sunshine Singers 
 "Doctor Dan" — written by Mirsky, Moore, and Brookshire; performed by Ashley, Moore, Rodriguez, and The Sunshine Singers 
 "Love Turned Blue" — written by Jai Josefs; performed by Shelly Rand and The Nashville Six 
 "Somebody Loved" — witten by Deb Talan and Steve Tannen; performed by The Weepies 
 "This Is the Way" — written by Mirsky, Moore, and Brookshire; performed by Ashley, Moore, Rodriguez, and The Sunshine Singers

See also
 List of film characters played cooperatively by multiple actors at the same time

References

External links
 
 

2000s Hebrew-language films
2004 films
2000s coming-of-age comedy-drama films
2000s avant-garde and experimental films
2004 comedy films
2004 drama films
2000s English-language films
2000s American films
2004 multilingual films
American independent films
2004 independent films
American coming-of-age comedy-drama films
American LGBT-related films
Films about pedophilia
Films about runaways
Films directed by Todd Solondz
Films about child sexual abuse
American avant-garde and experimental films
Films about abortion
Films about adolescence
Films about dysfunctional families
Films shot in Indiana
Films shot in New Jersey
Films shot in New York City
Lesbian-related films
American multilingual films